Geococcus may refer to:
 Geococcus (bug), a genus of bugs in the family Pseudococcidae
 Geococcus (plant), a genus of plants in the family Brassicaceae
 Geococcus (eukaryote), a genus of eukaryote in the order Arcellinida